Chris Moore (born June 16, 1993) is an American football wide receiver for the Houston Texans of the National Football League (NFL). He played college football at Cincinnati. He was drafted by the Baltimore Ravens in the fourth round of the 2016 NFL Draft, and played for the team from 2016 to 2020.

Early years
Moore attended and played high school football at Thomas Jefferson High School.

College career
Moore attended and played college football at Cincinnati.

Collegiate statistics

Professional career

Baltimore Ravens
Moore was drafted by the Baltimore Ravens in the fourth round of the 2016 NFL Draft with the 107th overall pick. During the 2016 season Moore appeared in 15 games where he had seven catches for 47 yards. In 2017, Moore appeared in 13 games, starting four of them. He finished the 2017 season with 18 catches for 248 yards and three touchdowns. In the 2018 season, Moore recorded 19 receptions for 196 yards and one touchdown. In the 2019 season, he finished the year with 3 receptions for 21 yards and no touchdowns.

Moore re-signed with the Ravens on a one-year contract on March 26, 2020. He was placed on injured reserve on November 7. He was activated on December 21, 2020.

Houston Texans
On March 24, 2021, Moore signed a one-year contract worth up to $8 million with the Houston Texans. He was released on August 31, 2021, and re-signed to the practice squad. He was elevated for the team's Week 5 game, and had a career-high five catches for 109 yards and a touchdown. He was then signed to the active roster on October 12, 2021.

On March 24, 2022, Moore re-signed with the Texans.

References

External links

Baltimore Ravens bio
Cincinnati Bearcats bio

1993 births
Living people
American football wide receivers
Cincinnati Bearcats football players
Baltimore Ravens players
Houston Texans players
Players of American football from Tampa, Florida